John Henry Cooke (June 29, 1911 – March 31, 1998) was an American lawyer and politician from New York.

Life
He was born on June 29, 1911, in Jamestown, Chautauqua County, New York, the son of Congressman Edmund F. Cooke (1885–1967) and Jennie Olivia (Swanson) Cooke (1884–1972). He attended Alden High School, and Central High School in Washington, D.C. He graduated from Washington and Lee University. He began to practice law in Alden in 1937, and entered politics as a Republican. He married Eleanor Jean Anson (1915–2003), and they had two children.

Cooke was Supervisor of the Town of Alden from 1943 to 1950; Chairman of the Board of Supervisors of Erie County in 1950; and a member of the New York State Senate from 1951 to 1962, sitting in the 168th, 169th, 170th, 171st, 172nd and 173rd New York State Legislatures.

On March 30, 1962, he was appointed by Gov. Nelson Rockefeller to the New York Court of Claims. He became Presiding Judge of the Court of Claims in 1973, and retired from the bench in 1978.

He died on March 31, 1998, in Buffalo, New York; and was buried at the Forest Lawn Cemetery there.

State Senator Richard T. Cooke (1913–2003) was his brother.

Sources

External links
 

1911 births
1998 deaths
Politicians from Buffalo, New York
Republican Party New York (state) state senators
Politicians from Jamestown, New York
Washington and Lee University alumni
New York (state) state court judges
Town supervisors in New York (state)
Burials at Forest Lawn Cemetery (Buffalo)
20th-century American lawyers
Lawyers from Buffalo, New York
20th-century American politicians